Säuling or Saulingspitze is a twin-peak mountain in the German Allgäu, though part of the mountain is in Austria. It is located near the town of Füssen and the castle Neuschwanstein.

External links 

Mountains of Bavaria
Ammergau Alps
Mountains of the Alps
Two-thousanders of Germany